Rodyukino is a rural locality (a village) in Krasnopolyanskoye Rural Settlement, Nikolsky District, Vologda Oblast, Russia. The population was 171 as of 2002. There are 5 streets.

Geography 
Rodyukino is located 3 km southeast of Nikolsk (the district's administrative centre) by road. Krivodeyevo is the nearest rural locality.

References 

Rural localities in Nikolsky District, Vologda Oblast